Downtown Country is the sixth studio album by American country singer Connie Smith. It was released in January 1967 via RCA Victor Records. Downtown Country was the second of Smith's albums to include string instrumentation to help create a pop-influenced sound. The album also featured the single "The Hurtin's All Over", which reached the top five of the Billboard country chart. The album itself reached the top five of Country LP's chart following its initial release.

Background
Connie Smith first reached a commercial breakthrough with 1964's "Once a Day", which topped the country songs chart for eight weeks. It brought several more follow-up singles into the top five including "If I Talk to Him" (1965) and "Then and Only Then" (1965). RCA Victor producers Chet Atkins and Bob Ferguson (the former was Smith's producer) saw opportunities in crossover pop music. This prompted the pair to encourage several artists to record softer pop material, including Smith. Bob Ferguson arranged for conductor Bill Walker to create a string section that would be included on Smith's recording sessions. Together, they would craft 1966's Born to Sing and 1967's Downtown Country. It was Ferguson's idea to name the album, basing his decision on the album's pop production. "I thought it would be an expansion move," he told writer Colin Escott. The cover for the album was shot at the Madison Square Shopping Center in Gallatin, Tennessee.

Recording and content
Smith entered the studio to record the sessions for Downtown Country between August 25 and October 27, 1966. The sessions were produced by Bob Ferguson and conducted by Bill Walker. The sessions were held at RCA Studio A located in Nashville, Tennessee. Smith was used to recording at the smaller RCA Studio B and recalled being upset about recording at the much larger Studio A. "In Studio B I could judge from the walls what my voice was doing. I controlled it by what I heard and what I felt in the room. The singer loses control in the big studio and the studio takes over." The album was Smith's second to include a string section, backed by violins and violas. Downtown Country consisted of 12 tracks. Five of the tracks were original recordings, including "The Hurtin's All Over", "It'll Be Easy" and "Your Mem'ry Comes Along". The remaining selections were cover versions of pop songs: Petula Clark's "Downtown", Dean Martin's "Everybody Loves Somebody", Connie Francis's "My Heart Has a Mind of Its Own" and Bobby Vee's "The Night Has a Thousand Eyes".

Release and reception

Downtown Country was originally released in January 1967 on the RCA Victor label. It marked the sixth studio collection of Smith's career. The disc was issued as a vinyl LP, containing six songs on both sides of the record. Decades later, the album was reissued to digital and streaming sites including Apple Music. At the time of its original release, Downtown Country spent 15 weeks on the Billboard magazine Country LP's chart, peaking at the number five position in April 1967. It was Smith's fifth studio disc to chart in the top five. Billboard magazine reviewed the project and gave it a positive response. Reviewers called Smith's covers "Downtown" and "My Heart Has a Mind of Its Own" as "exceptional". They described her reading of Sandy Posey's "Born a Woman" to be a "powerful rendition". The album was later rated four out of five stars from Allmusic. The album's only single was the track "The Hurtin's All Over", which was issued by RCA Victor in September 1966. The single peaked at number three on the Billboard Hot Country Songs chart in December 1966.

Track listings

Vinyl version

Digital version

Personnel
All credits are adapted from the liner notes of Downtown Country and the biography booklet by Colin Escott titled Born to Sing.

Musical personnel

 Brenton Banks – violin
 Byron Bach – cello
 Howard Carpenter – viola
 Jerry Carrigan – drums
 Dorothy Dillard – background vocals
 Ray Edenton – guitar
 Dolores Edgin – background vocals
 Solie Fott – viola
 Buddy Harman – drums
 Lillian Hunt – violin
 Roy Huskey – bass
 Shelly Kurland – violin
 Martin Katahn – viola
 Pierre Menard – violin

 Wayne Moss – bass guitar, guitar
 Weldon Myrick – steel guitar
 Priscilla Hubbard – background vocals
 Dean Porter – guitar
 Harold Ragsdale – harpsichord, vibes
 Hargus "Pig" Robbins – piano
 Connie Smith – lead vocals
 Leo Taylor – drums
 Gary Vanosdale – viola
 Pete Wade – guitar
 Bill Walker – harpsichord
 Lamar Watkins – guitar
 William Wright – background vocals
 Harvey Wolfe – cello

Technical personnel
 Bob Ferguson – Producer
 Bill Walker – Contractor

Chart performance

Release history

References

Footnotes

Books

 

1967 albums
Connie Smith albums
RCA Victor albums
Albums produced by Bob Ferguson (music)